The monument to Lázaro Cárdenas is installed in Parque España, in Mexico City, Mexico.

References

External links

 

Condesa
Monuments and memorials in Mexico City
Outdoor sculptures in Mexico City
Sculptures of men in Mexico